Kálmán Petrovics is a Hungarian sprint and marathon canoeist who competed in the mid to late 1980s. He won a complete set of medals in the K-4 10000 m event at the ICF Canoe Sprint World Championships with  a gold in 1985, a silver in 1987, and two bronze in 1982 and 1986.

References

Hungarian male canoeists
Year of birth missing (living people)
Living people
ICF Canoe Sprint World Championships medalists in kayak
Medalists at the ICF Canoe Marathon World Championships
20th-century Hungarian people